Greyhound Racing Victoria is the Controlling Body that regulates greyhound racing in Victoria, Australia. Greyhound Racing Victoria is based in Melbourne, Australia. Greyhound Racing Victoria currently manages 13 Tracks. Greyhound Racing Victoria holds 1000 race meetings a year, with over $40 million of prize money given out every year.

Fasttrack 
Greyhound Racing Victoria Currently uses their website Fasttrack for nominating greyhounds and race results. Fasttrack has records of every dog in the state. Fasttrack has records of every race that was held since the beginning of Fasttrack.

GAP Program 
In 1996, the Greyhound Adoption Program was founded by Mel Tochner and Anita Smith. The Greyhound Adoption program works with trainers and owners to help adopt greyhounds to good homes after they have finished racing. The Greyhound Adoption Program is based in Semour, Victoria, and has a purpose built facility for re-homing greyhounds.

Venues

Feature Races 
 Melbourne Cup
 Top Gun
 Hume Cup
 Sandown Cup
 Sapphire Crown
 Harrison Dawson
 Geelong Cup
 Ballarat Cup
 Australia Cup
 Bendigo Cup
 Traralgon Cup
 Horsham Cup
 Sale Cup
 Cranbourne Cup
 Warragul Cup
 Warrnambool Cup
 Healesville Cup

References 

Victoria
Establishments in Australia
Sports culture in Australia